Parandrinae is a subfamily of the longhorn beetle family (Cerambycidae). This subfamily includes only a few genera. Atypical for cerambycids, the antennae are quite short, and the tarsi have 5 easily  visible segments; they are thus rather similar in appearance to stag beetles.

Genera
Parandrinae contains the following genera:

 Acutandra
 Birandra
 Erichsonia
 Neandra
 Parandra

References

 
Cerambycidae